Walter Arnold GC (30 August 1906 – 12 March 1988) was a recipient of the Empire Gallantry Medal (later exchanged for the George Cross) and a Royal Air Force airman.

On 20 June 1928, Leading Aircraftman Arnold was a passenger in an aircraft which crashed on landing at Digby Aerodrome.  Arnold was able to free himself from the burning wreckage but he re-entered the flames in order to rescue the unconscious pilot.  In doing so, Arnold sustained burns to his face, neck and hands and his actions undoubtedly saved the pilot's life.

Citation

References

1906 births
1988 deaths
Recipients of the Empire Gallantry Medal
Royal Air Force recipients of the George Cross
Royal Air Force airmen
Survivors of aviation accidents or incidents